The Talbot Avenue bridge in Montgomery County, Maryland, was a historic one-lane metal girder bridge that connected the neighborhood of Lyttonsville to downtown Silver Spring. Built in 1918 and dismantled in 2019, the bridge had historic value as a connection from an antebellum community founded by a free Black laborer to neighborhoods where for decades Black people were allowed to work, but not live.

As of 2022, its main span is in storage with plans to display it along the Georgetown Branch Trail.

History 
The bridge replaced an earlier span across the Baltimore and Ohio Railroad's double-track Metropolitan Branch line, which had opened in 1873. 

Its primary span used components of a dismantled railroad turntable. The structure was 106 feet long and 14.5 feet wide, from timber curb to curb and an out-to-out width of 18 feet. The greater structure consisted of a through-plate girder in the center span, rolled girders in the end spans, timber floor beams, a wood plank deck and a timber railing. 

A new deck was added in 1986. The bridge connected Hanover Street and Lanier Drive.  

A 1993 inspection report indicated the structure was in fair to poor condition with cracking, corrosion and section loss. The wood and steel on the bridge had been in disrepair, making it hard to keep intact. 

In 2016, preservationists protested plans to demolish the structure to make way for the planned light rail Purple Line.

In May 2017, the bridge was closed to vehicles after a safety inspection determined it to be unsafe.

The bridge closed in June 2019, and was dismantled later that year. Its main span was preserved and stored, with plans to place it on public display along the Georgetown Branch Trail.

It will be replaced by a new two-lane bridge, which is currently under construction. It will carry the Georgetown Branch Trail extension of the Capital Crescent Trail to Silver Spring.

In February 2019, the bridge was recorded as part of the Historic American Engineering Record. The project historian wrote, "The bridge also is significant for its social history and as a cultural landscape element. The tracks beneath the bridge formed a dividing line separating segregated suburban communities. African Americans living west of the bridge in Lyttonsville relied on the structure as a vital link to jobs, shopping, and recreational opportunities unavailable in their community. People east of the bridge lived in what was historically a sundown suburb: a place where African Americans could not buy or rent homes and where Jim Crow segregation was rigidly enforced."

References

External links 

 Talbot Avenue: a bridge in black and white
 BridgeHunter - Talbot Avenue Railroad Overpass
 UglyBridges.com - Talbot Avenue bridge

African-American history of Montgomery County, Maryland
Bridges in Montgomery County, Maryland
Downtown Silver Spring, Maryland
History of Maryland
Road bridges in Maryland